Currock Hill is a hill in Tyne and Wear, England, which at 259 m (850 ft) is the highest point in the county, and in the metropolitan borough of Gateshead.

The name ‘currock’ comes from the Celtic word for a cairn or a stack of stones, a development of the word for a rock, and is still widely used in the North East.

Geography
It is situated between the villages of Chopwell and Hedley on the Hill, on the border with Northumberland to the west of Newcastle upon Tyne. The hill forms part of the watershed divide between the catchments of the River Tyne to the north and the Derwent to the south.

The panorama from the hill is considered to have "commanding views towards the Pennines and Tyne Valley to the West, the Cheviot Hills to the North with Tyneside and North Sea Coast to the East."

Flying
There has been a long association with flying on Currock Hill: during the First World War an area on the southern flank of the hill was designated as a relief airfield or landing ground for No.36 Squadron of the Royal Flying Corps, which was based at Cramlington. It was a Home Defence squadron, and patrolled the coastal area around Newcastle to prevent attacks by German Zeppelins.

More recently, the northern part of the hill has been used as the location for the Northumbria Gliding Club. The club has a variety of aircraft including three dual seat gliders, a single seat Astir CS77 and two Aeropro Eurofox tug planes, all of which use the grass runway at the site.

See also
List of English counties by highest point

References

External links

 Map of Currock Hill - Streetmap.co.uk

Highest points of English counties
Mountains and hills of England